Plasmodium sasai is a parasite of the genus Plasmodium subgenus Sauramoeba.

Like all Plasmodium species P. sasai has both vertebrate and insect hosts. The vertebrate hosts for this parasite are reptiles.

Description 

The parasite was first described by Telford and Ball in 1969 in the lacertid Takydromus tachydromoides.

Geographical occurrence 

This species is found in Japan and Thailand.

Clinical features and host pathology 

The vertebrate hosts for this species are lizards of the genus Takydromus. The insect vector is not yet known.

Infection of Takydromus tachydromoides is commonw with 90% adults infected. Infection occurs early in life with 80%+ infected within the first few weeks of hatching.

References

Further reading 

sandoshami